André Guimbretière (1923–2014) was a French Indologist, professor of languages of Inda (Hindi, Urdu) at the Institut national des langues et civilisations orientales of which he was president from 1969 to 1971.

He was a specialist of Muhammad Iqbal.

Publications 
 Related to the Indian world
 Le Problème du Cachemire, Orient, 1966
 Wilfred Cantwell Smith,  (1916–2000), L'Islam dans le monde moderne [Islam in modern history], préface et traduction d'André Guimbretière, Éditions Payot, 1962
 Personnalisme théocentrique et vision motrice de la beauté chez Muhammad Iqbal : contribution à l'étude de « Wahdat al-Shuhud »
 Muhammad Iqbal, « La mosquée de Cordoue » (translated by André Guimbretière and Mohd. Hasan Askari), in Esprit, 1958
 Le Pakistan depuis la « Révolution pacifique » d´octobre 1958, Orient, vol. 34
Que sais-je ?, n° 489

 Related to poetry
1949: Sans tambour... ni trompette, Regain, (preface by Luc Estang)
1953: Soleils, dieux amers, Imprimerie des poètes
1955: Concerto pour chanson et poésie, Delfica
1960: Le Passager de l'aube,
1963: Aurore première, La Rochelle
1966: Choix de textes de , présentation by André Guimbretière, (Poètes d'aujourd'hui, n° 157)
  (1917–1980), Le Sang des nuits, postface by André Guimbretière, Seghers, 1966
1973: Approche de l'espace vertiginal. À propos de « Traverser l'interdit » de Lucienne Hoyaux, Ottignies (Belgium)

Bibliography 
 Robert Sabatier, Histoire de la poésie française - Poésie du XX - Métamorphoses et Modernité, 1988 .

References

External links 
 André Guimbretière on Archives et musée de la littérature

French Indologists
Linguists from France
20th-century French poets
Translators to French
Translators from Hindi
1923 births
2014 deaths
20th-century French translators